The 2012 PSA World Series Finals is the men's edition of the 2012 PSA World Series Finals (Prize money : $110 000). The top 8 players in the PSA World Series 2012 were qualified for the event. The event took place at the Queen's Club in London in England between 2–6 January 2013. Amr Shabana won his second PSA World Series Finals trophy, beating Nick Matthew in the final.

Seeds

Group stage results

Pool A

Pool B

Draw and results

See also
2012 WSA World Series Finals
PSA World Tour 2012
PSA World Series 2012
PSA World Series Finals

References

External links
PSA World Series website
World Series Final 2012 official website
World Series Final 2012 SquashInfo website

PSA World Tour
W
2012 in English sport